María Catalina Gómez Quiza (born 25 May 1995) is a Colombian racing cyclist, best known for winning the 2020 Colombian National Road Race Championships.

Major results
2020 
1st  Road Race, National Road Championships
8th Grand Prix Develi

References

External links

Living people
Colombian female cyclists
1995 births
20th-century Colombian women
21st-century Colombian women